Vincenzo Sarnelli may refer to:
 Tony Tammaro, stage name of the Italian musician Vincenzo Sarnelli
 Vincenzo Maria Sarnelli, 19th-century Italian Catholic bishop

See also